Solomon Warriors FC is a Solomon Islands football club based in Honiara. The club plays in the Telekom S-League, the top-tier in Solomon Islands football. They play their matches at Lawson Tama Stadium, the biggest stadium in the Solomon Islands.

History
The Solomon Warriors were formerly known as Uncles FC and have also played in the S-League under the name Wantoks.
They are the most successful club in the Solomon Islands. They have won the Telekom S-League six times, the most in the Solomon Islands. The club has also played in numerous OFC Champions Leagues.

Achievements 
Melanesian Super Cup:
Winners (2): 2014, 2015

S-League:
Winners (7): 2011–12, 2013–14, 2015-16, 2017, 2018, 2019–20, 2021-22
Runners-up (2): 2010–11, 2014–15

Telekom S-League Championship Series:
Winners (2): 2011, 2012

Current squad 
Squad for the 2020 OFC Champions League

Staff

References

External links 
 

Football clubs in the Solomon Islands
Honiara
1981 establishments in the Solomon Islands
Association football clubs established in 1981